Henry Ottmann (also Henri Ottmann)  (10 April 1877 – 1 June 1927) was a French painter and printmaker.

Biography 
Henry Ottmann was born on 10 April 1877 in Ancenis (Loire-Atlantique). He made his debut at the Salon La Libre Esthétique in Brussels in 1904 and took part in the Salon des Indépendants in Paris from 1905, the Salon d'Automne, the Salon Société Nationale des Beaux-Arts and the Salon des Tuileries.

In 1911 and 1912, Ottmann exhibited at the Artistes de la Société Moderne at the Gallery Paul Durand-Ruel together with Armand Guillaumin, Henri Lebasque and others.

In 1912, Henry Ottmann exhibited at the gallery Eugène Druet.

In 1919 he was working on illustrations of La Gebre periodical in Woodcut technique together with Paul Signac, Henriette Tirman and other painters.

In 1920, Ottmann exhibited at the gallery Marcel Bernheim together with Manguin, Tirman, Alexandre-Paul Canu and others.

In 1922, he exhibited at the Exposition du Cercle Artistique de Bruxelles together with those of Paul-Albert Besnard, Pierre Bonnard, Raoul Dufy, Othon Friesz, Charles Guérin, André Lhote, Henri Matisse, Paul Signac, Maurice de Vlaminck and others.

In 1926, Ottmann exhibited at the gallery L.Dru (Paris) and at the Parisian gallery La Palette Française, and in March 1927 in the gallery Armand Drouand.

He died in Vernon on 1 June 1927 after a car accident.

Gallery of paintings 

References

Sources
 Site Oxford Index Benezit Dictionary of Artists, 2006, (subscription or library membership required)
 Gazette des beaux-arts 1906/07 (A48,T36)-1906/12, p.476, Salon d'automne, Gallica BnF
 Les Hommes du Jour, 1914/05/30 (A7,N332) p.10, Gallica BnF
 Le Carnet des artistes: art ancien, art moderne, arts appliqués/ rédacteur en chef Louis Vauxcelles,  1917 (N1)- (N21), p.3,  Henry Ottmann, Gallica BnF
 Le Bulletin de la vie artistique,  1923/07/01 (A4,N13), p.281; 1926/05/15 (A7,N10) p. 152;1926/06/01 (A7,N11) Gallica BnF
 Gazette des beaux-arts; 1920/07 (A62,T2)-1920/12, p.320; 1925/07 (A67,T12)-1925/12, p.277; 1926/01 (A68,T13)-1926/06, p.279; 1927/07 (A69,T16)-1927/12, p.323; Gallica BnF
 La Revue de l'art ancien et moderne, 1926/01 (T49)-1926/05, p.156; 1927/06 (T52)-1927/12, p.221 Gallica BnF
 Art et décoration; 1920/01 (T37)-1920/06; p.75; 1927/07 (A31,T52,N307)-1927/12 (A31,T52,N312), p.162. Gallica BnF
 Les Annales politiques et littéraires: revue populaire paraissant le dimanche/ dir. Adolphe Brisson, 1927/06/15 (T88,N2288), p.621, Retrospective, 1928/07/15 (N2314), p.82 Gallica BnF
 La Renaissance de l'art français et des industries de luxe, p.361;1926/06 (A9,N6); 1926/07 (A9,N7), p.432;1926/07 (A9,N7), p 624; Retrospective, 1928/01 (A11,N1)-1928/12 (A11,N12), p.358; Retrospective, 1930/08 p.214 Gallica BnF
 Journal des débats politiques et littéraires,  1928/06/29 (Numéro 180), p.4 Tableaux Modernes Gallica BnF
 Les Trois Grâces Henry Ottmann, retrospective 1933 at the gallery Georges Petit (Hôtel Drouot) archive.org

External links 

 Works Henry Ottmann in the museums of France; Joconde, culture.gouv.fr
 Works Henry Ottmann, artvalue.fr
 Works Henry Ottmann, artnet.com

1877 births
1927 deaths
19th-century French painters
French male painters
20th-century French painters
20th-century French male artists
Landscape artists
French still life painters
Post-impressionist painters
Modern painters
Woodcut designers
French illustrators
Académie Julian alumni
Fauvism
20th-century French printmakers
19th-century French male artists